Donata Minorati (born 4 March 1965) is an Italian rower. She competed in the women's quadruple sculls event at the 1984 Summer Olympics.

References

External links
 

1965 births
Living people
Italian female rowers
Olympic rowers of Italy
Rowers at the 1984 Summer Olympics
Place of birth missing (living people)